This is a list of Coleco Adam games compatible with the Home Computer system or the ColecoVision Expansion port 3. Some of these games are exclusive only on the Coleco Adam, while others are released for both the Coleco Adam and ColecoVision. In this case, the Coleco Adam version may have additional features or use more memory for more advanced graphics (e.g., Alcazar: The Forgotten Fortress).

The Coleco Adam has a total of 45 games, 26 only being playable on the Adam, 19 being superior ports of ColecoVision titles.

List of ROM Cartridge Coleco Adam exclusives
Adventure Pack I
Adventure Pack II
Alcazar: The Forgotten Fortress
America At War
Appian
Castle of Doom
Diablo
Dragon's Lair
Dragons Cavern
Fathom
Flash Card Trivia
Geometry I
Geometry II
Keyman
Paint Master
Pepper II
States & Capitals
Super Game Pack I
Super Game Pack II
Super Zaxxon
War Room

List of Floppy Disk Coleco Adam games
Bounty Hunter
Data Keeper
Diablo
Strategy Pack I
Trek

List of ColecoVision-Coleco Adam shared games
Black Gold
Buck Rogers: Planet of Zoom
BurgerTime
Choplifter
Coleco Tennis
Dam Buster
Donkey Kong
Donkey Kong Jr.
Dukes of Hazzard
H.E.R.O.
Horse Racing Challenge — a homebrew reconstruction port of a never-released Fidelity Electronics-sponsored equestrian sports/gaming video game which was originally planned for a 1982 release.
Nova Blast
Pitfall II
Q*bert's Qubes
River Raid
Rock N' Bolt
Tapper
Tutankham
Wing War
Zaxxon

References

 
Coleco Adam